Richard Alan Kranitz (born September 15, 1958) is an American professional baseball coach for the Atlanta Braves of Major League Baseball (MLB).  Previously, he served as the pitching coach for the Baltimore Orioles, Milwaukee Brewers, Florida Marlins and Philadelphia Phillies.

Playing career
Kranitz attended Apollo High School in Glendale, Arizona.  He went to Yavapai College and Oklahoma State University.

Kranitz was drafted by the Milwaukee Brewers in the fourth round (101st overall) of the 1979 Major League Baseball draft. He pitched in the minor leagues from 1979 through 1985 without making the majors.

Coaching career

Kranitz served as a player-coach with the Pikeville Cubs in 1984 and the Winston-Salem Spirits in 1985, though he pitched a total of three innings in those seasons.  He served as a minor league pitching coach, Minor League Pitching Coordinator and an assistant coach for the Cubs organization through 2001, when he was named the bullpen coach for the 2002 season.  Kranitz managed the Daytona Cubs in 2003 and served as the pitching coach for the Iowa Cubs in 2004 and 2005.

Kranitz was named the pitching coach for the Florida Marlins in 2006. He was named Baseball America's 2006 Major League Coach of the Year in his first year as pitching coach for the Marlins.  Kranitz remained with the Marlins in 2007, but resigned shortly before the end of the season.

In 2008, Kranitz became the pitching coach for the Baltimore Orioles.  There, he struggled to find the same success as in Florida; in 2008 and 2009 the Orioles' pitching staff posted team ERAs of 5.13 and 5.15, respectively.  In 2010, although the end-of-year numbers were much more respectable, the team was doomed by a historically futile start that saw them win only 34 of their first 105 games.

On November 1, 2010, Kranitz accepted an offer from the Houston Astros to become their minor league pitching coordinator.

On November 15, 2010, it was announced that Kranitz would be replacing Rick Peterson as pitching coach for the Milwaukee Brewers. He was dismissed after the 2015 season.

Kranitz became the bullpen coach for the Philadelphia Phillies in the 2016 season, and was promoted to pitching coach for the 2018 season. Kranitz was fired by the Phillies shortly after the 2018 season.

The Atlanta Braves announced on December 6, 2018, that Kranitz had joined manager Brian Snitker's staff.

Kranitz won the World Series with the Atlanta Braves on November 2, 2021.

References

External links

Coaching statistics and information from Retrosheet

 
 

 
 

 
 

 
 

1958 births
Living people
American expatriate baseball players in Canada
Atlanta Braves coaches
Baltimore Orioles coaches
Baseball coaches from California
Baseball players from California
Burlington Bees players
Chicago Cubs coaches
El Paso Diablos players
Florida Marlins coaches
Holyoke Millers players
Major League Baseball bullpen coaches
Major League Baseball pitching coaches
Milwaukee Brewers coaches
Minor league baseball coaches
Oklahoma State Cowboys baseball players
Philadelphia Phillies coaches
Pikeville Cubs players
Sportspeople from San Rafael, California
Stockton Ports players
Vancouver Canadians players
Winston-Salem Spirits players